Acronine is an anti-tumor chemical that has yielded synthetic anti-tumor derivatives.

References

Ketones